The 2011 Hungarian Athletics Championships were the 116th edition of the Hungarian Athletics Championships, which took place on 6–7 August 2011 at the Városi Szabadidőközpont in Szekszárd.

Qualification standards
Athletes who have attained the qualification mark in each specific event might participate at the championships:

Schedule

Day 1

Day 2

Results

Men

Women

References

2011
Hungarian Athletics Championships
Hungarian Athletics Championships